Lyrics of a Pimp is an underground rap album from Eightball & MJG. The album consisted of songs before their first album Comin' Out Hard. The songs were recorded from Omni Entertainment. It was re-release and remastered in 2004 with two other unreleased songs Real In The Feel and Oh Nah-Nah-Nah.

Track listing
 Intro 
 Listen to the Lyrics
 Kick da Shit
 Pimp'N My Own Rhyme (MJG solo)
 Niggas Like Us
 Smokin' Chicken
 Armed Robbery
 Playaz Dream (Eightball solo)
 The Fat Mack (Eightball solo)
 Got 2 Be Real (Eightball solo)
 Bitches
 Listen to the Lyrics remix 2000
 Pimps in the House (MJG solo)
 Its a Pimp Thang
 Real In The Feel (Patty Man)	
 Oh Nah-Nah-Nah (Kool Ace)

References

8Ball & MJG albums
1997 compilation albums
Gangsta rap compilation albums